Agnė Visockaitė-Eggerth (born 4 August 1978) is a track and field sprint athlete who competes internationally for Lithuania.

Achievements

Personal bests
Indoor
50 m: 6.31 (NR)
55 m: 6.75 (NR)
60 m: 7.23 (NR)
200 m: 23.22 (NR)
Outdoor
100 m: 11.29
200 m: 23.22 (NR)

See also
Lithuania at the Olympics

References
 
 Agnė Eggerth at LSE
 

1978 births
Lithuanian female sprinters
Sportspeople from Kaunas
Athletes (track and field) at the 2000 Summer Olympics
Athletes (track and field) at the 2004 Summer Olympics
Olympic athletes of Lithuania
Living people